Rui Maia (23 December 1925 – 2 March 2012) was a Portuguese sprinter. He competed in the men's 100 metres at the 1952 Summer Olympics.

References

External links
 

1925 births
2012 deaths
Athletes (track and field) at the 1952 Summer Olympics
Portuguese male sprinters
Olympic athletes of Portugal
Place of birth missing